SS7 or SS-7 may refer to:

 Signalling System No. 7, to set up and tear down telephone calls
 SS-7 Saddler, the NATO reporting name of R-16 missile
 China Railways SS7, an electric locomotive model in China
 Super Socket 7, a chip socket introduced by AMD